Nymphicula cyanolitha is a moth in the family Crambidae. It was described by Edward Meyrick in 1886. It is found on Fiji.

The wingspan is 13–15 mm. The base of the forewings is brown with a white subbasal fascia and a yellow antemedian fascia, edged with brown. The medial area is scattered with brown scales and the terminal area is orange. The base of the hindwings is brown. The subbasal fascia is white and the antemedian fascia yellow.

References

Nymphicula
Moths described in 1886